HORMA domain-containing protein 1 (HORMAD1) also known as cancer/testis antigen 46 (CT46) is a protein that in humans is encoded by the HORMAD1  gene.

Function 
HORMAD1 is a cancer/testis antigen that plays a key role in meiotic progression. It has shown to regulate 3 different functions during meiosis. Specifically, it:
 Ensures that sufficient numbers of processed DNA double-strand breaks (DSBs) are available for successful homology search by increasing the steady-state numbers of single-stranded DSB ends 
 Promotes synaptonemal-complex formation independently of its role in homology search.
Plays a key role in the male mid-pachytene checkpoint and the female meiotic prophase checkpoint: required for efficient build-up of ATR activity on unsynapsed chromosome regions, a process believed to form the basis of meiotic silencing of unsynapsed chromatin (MSUC) and meiotic prophase quality control in both sexes (By similarity)

Role in cancer 
HORMAD1 has been shown to have a role in Triple-Negative Breast Cancers  and in Lung Adenocarcinomas. In particular, the Watkins et al., paper suggested that overexpression of HORMAD1 is a driver of homologous recombination repair deficiency in these types of breast cancers, and induced widespread allelic imbalances in the genome with implications for  platinum and PARP inhibitor sensitivity.

References

Further reading